John Mohun may refer to 

John Mohun, 1st Baron Mohun of Okehampton (1595–1641), English MP for Grampound
John Mohun, 2nd Baron Mohun (1320–1376), original Knight of the Garter
John de Mohun, 1st Baron Mohun (d. 1330), Baron Mohun